Barongarook is a rural locality in Victoria, Australia, situated in the Shire of Colac Otway.

References

Towns in Victoria (Australia)